Stamatis A. "Sam" Mastrogiannis (born March 2, 1942) is a Greek American professional poker player who won two bracelets at the World Series of Poker.

Poker career
Mastrogiannis has cashed three times at the World Series of Poker and won two bracelets. He won his first bracelet in 1979 in the $1,000 Razz event. He won his second bracelet in 1986 in the $1,500 Seven Card Stud event.

He won a Seven-card stud event at Amarillo Slim's Super Bowl of Poker in 1982.

Although Mastrogiannis is mostly a cash game player, his lifetime tournament winnings exceed $145,000.

World Series of Poker Bracelets

Sam Mastrogiannis invested his poker winnings and started his own shoe company.  His shoe line was called the Mastroni. The shoes were sold at Nordstrom under the signature label.

Notes 

1942 births
American poker players
World Series of Poker bracelet winners
Mastrogiannis, Sam
Living people